Antonio Joseph is the name of:

 Antonio Joseph (artist) (1921–2016), Haitian artist
 Antonio Joseph (politician) (1846–1910), delegate from the Territory of New Mexico

See also